Bareilly Junction railway station (station code:- BE, BRY) is a railway station  serving Bareilly city in Uttar Pradesh. It is an important station as well as the headquarters of Izzatnagar railway division of the North Eastern Railway zone & Moradabad railway division of the Northern Railway zone. It lies on Lucknow–Moradabad line and Lucknow-Sitapur-Lakhimpur-Pilibhit-Bareilly-Kasganj Line provides a stop for most trains passing through. Bareilly Junction used to serve both broad and metre gauge, Bareilly Junction was connected to Lucknow by both Broad Gauge and Meter Gauge, Broad Gauge was connected to Lucknow via Tilhar, Shahjahanpur, Hardoi. On the other hand Meter Gauge was connected to Lucknow via Pilibhit-Mailani-Lakhimpur-Sitapur, but now the metre gauge is converted into broad gauge.

History 
After the British Indian Government purchased the Indian Branch Railway on 31 March 1872, and renamed the Lucknow–Kanpur main line as the Oudh and Rohilkhand Railway, railway services started to expand towards the west of Lucknow. The construction of a railway line from Lucknow to Sandila and then further onwards to Hardoi was completed in 1872. This line was further extended to Bareilly on 1 November 1873. Prior to that, another railway line connecting Moradabad to Chandausi had already been built in 1872; it too was extended to Bareilly, the construction completed on 22 December 1873.

A new railway line connecting Bareilly and Moradabad via Rampur, called the Bareilly–Moradabad Chord, was approved on 4 December 1891, and was completed by 8 June 1894. On 8 December 1894, the main line was officially diverted to this chord, while the older line was renamed the Chandausi loop.

Connectivity 
Bareilly railway station is well connected to Lucknow, Delhi, Jammu, Amritsar, Ambala, Jalandhar, Pathankot, Ludhiana, Gorakhpur, Varanasi, Mau, Ghazipur, Howrah, Guwahati, Ranchi, Patna, Agra, Aligarh, Moradabad, Badaun, Dehradun, Allahabad, Kathgodam, Mumbai, Ahmedabad.

Electric Bus 
City Electric buses are also started in the city. Initially 6 buses started on 3 Major routs on 6 Feb, 2022. Now 13 buses out of 25 buses are in operation on 5 routs. Faridpur and Bhojipura are connected with this service.

Metro 
The station is also proposed as an intersection for the planned Bareilly Metro routes and a terminal station for Yellow line.

Industry 
Bareilly is the 50th Major city in India and 8th in Uttar Pradesh. It has many large industries, which are providing jobs in large scale in the city. B.L.Agro Industries Ltd., Raama Shyama Paper Industries, Amar Alum & Allied Chemicals Pvt. Ltd., Amar Narayan Industries Pvt. Ltd. are the major industries of the city. In which Amar Alum & Allied Chemicals Pvt. Ltd. is India's largest Alum Manufacturer.

Gallery

See also
 List of railway stations in India
 Kerakat railway station

References

External links

Railway junction stations in Uttar Pradesh
Moradabad railway division
1964 establishments in Uttar Pradesh
Railway stations opened in 1964
Railway stations in Bareilly